Owen Goldin (born June 7, 1957) is an American philosopher and Professor of Philosophy at Marquette University. He is the President of the Metaphysical Society of America. Goldin is known for his research on Aristotle's Posterior Analytics.

Books
 Explaining an Eclipse: Aristotle's Posterior Analytics 2.1-10 (University of Michigan Press, 1996)

References

20th-century American philosophers
21st-century American philosophers
Philosophy academics
1957 births
Presidents of the Metaphysical Society of America
Living people
Marquette University faculty
Place of birth missing (living people)
University of Texas at Austin alumni
Commentators on Aristotle